Superstar (2017) is a Gujarati romantic thriller film directed by Bhavin Wadia. It is presented by Navkar Events Private Limited and produced by Snehan Dave. The film marks the debut of Dhruvin Shah and is the first Gujarati film of TV actor Rashami Desai. The film was slated to release on 3 February 2017. The film was released on Netflix in the US on 10 August 2017.

Plot 
Rishi Kapadia aka RK is a reigning Bollywood superstar. Married to Anjali (Rashami Desai), he has a son and a happy family. Their smooth life is shaken up and thrown out of gear when a series of incidents put RK and Anjali's life in a fix. The film tells the story of their race to find out who is trying to destroy their lives before the antagonist succeeds.

Cast
 Dhruvin Shah as Rishi Kapadia aka RK
 Rashami Desai as Anjali Kapadia
Harshad kumar as inspector vaghela

Soundtrack 
Superstar features songs sung by Armaan Malik, Shekhar Ravjiani, Arvind Vegda and Aishwarya Majumdar.

Music and background score for the film is composed by Parth Bharat Thakkar.

Awards and nominations

References 

2010s Gujarati-language films